Mario Sandoval Alarcón (May 18, 1923 – April 17, 2003) was a Guatemalan politician.

Biography
He is the founder in 1960 of the Movimiento de Liberación Nacional (MLN) which was a nacionalist anti-communist political party. In 1954, he helped support colonel Carlos Castillo's coup against Jacobo Árbenz.

He served as President of the Congress from 1970 to 1974, when he was sworn in as the Vice President.

Sandoval served as Vice President from 1 July 1974 to 1 July 1978 during the presidency of Kjell Laugerud. During his time as vicepresident he helped president Kjell after the 1976 earthquake that affected a great part of the country. In 1982, he placed second in that year's presidential election. He was unsuccessful again three years later, in 1985.

Sandoval was a leader of the World Anti-Communist League (WACL).

References

Presidents of the Congress of Guatemala
Vice presidents of Guatemala
People of the Guatemalan Civil War
National Liberation Movement (Guatemala) politicians
1923 births
2003 deaths